Donnie Henderson (born May 17, 1957) is an American football coach. He most recently was the defensive coordinator at Arizona State, and before that he was defensive coordinator of the Salt Lake Stallions of the Alliance of American Football (AAF).

Biography
Henderson first joined the Jets during the 2004 NFL season. In 2005, the Jets had a second-ranked defense against the pass, but a 32nd-ranked defense against the run, which undoubtedly was one of the factors leading to the team's disappointing 4–12 record (in addition to Chad Pennington and Curtis Martin being absent for most of the season due to injury).  Henderson was not kept on after head coach Herman Edwards was replaced by Eric Mangini following the season.

Henderson soon accepted the defensive coordinator position for the Detroit Lions and new head coach, Rod Marinelli.  The Lions went 3–13 in 2006 and finished the season ranked 27th out of 32 in total defense.  Henderson was fired from his position on January 2, 2007.

In 2010, he was hired by the Arizona Cardinals as a defensive backs coach.

Henderson coached at Southern University in 2011 and was named the defensive backs coach at Syracuse University in 2012. He was hired by the Buffalo Bills in 2013 to coach the defensive backs. He was a coach in The Spring League in 2017 and 2018.

In October 2018, he was announced as the defensive coordinator for the Salt Lake Stallions of the Alliance of American Football.

During the 2021 season, Henderson filled in at Arizona State as the interim defensive backs coach, and then following the season, he was promoted to defensive coordinator.

References 

1975 births
Living people
Sportspeople from Baltimore
Players of American football from Maryland
African-American coaches of American football
National Football League defensive coordinators
Arizona Cardinals coaches
Baltimore Ravens coaches
Buffalo Bills coaches
Detroit Lions coaches
New York Jets coaches
Arizona State Sun Devils football coaches
California Golden Bears football coaches
Houston Cougars football coaches
Idaho Vandals football coaches
Sacramento Mountain Lions coaches
Southern Jaguars football coaches
Syracuse Orange football coaches
Utah State Aggies football coaches
The Spring League coaches
Salt Lake Stallions coaches
21st-century African-American sportspeople
20th-century African-American sportspeople